The Vitim sculpin (Cyphocottus megalops) is a species of ray-finned fish belonging to the family Cottidae, the typical sculpins. This sculpin is endemic to Lake Baikal, Siberia. It is known to dwell at a depth range of 140–370 metres, usually inhabiting the silty bottom at around 100 m. Males can reach a maximum total length of 16.5 centimetres. It can live for up to 9 years.

References

Vitim sculpin
Fish described in 1902
Fish of Lake Baikal